Stelios Papafloratos (Greek: Στέλιος Παπαφλωράτος; born 27 January 1954) is a retired Greek football goalkeeper.

During his career he played for Aris from 1970 to 1982. He earned 2 caps for the Greece national football team, and participated in UEFA Euro 1980.

References

1954 births
Living people
Greek footballers
Greece international footballers
Aris Thessaloniki F.C. players
UEFA Euro 1980 players
Super League Greece players
Association football goalkeepers